William Tolfrey (1778 – 4 January 1817, in Colombo) was a British civil servant in Ceylon (now Sri Lanka) and translator of the Bible into Sinhalese. The BFBS revised his translation from 1895 to 1910.

Life
Born about 1778, he was educated in England. Going in 1794 to Calcutta, where his father was living, he had a subordinate post in a public official but gave it up for an ensigncy in the 76th (Foot) Regiment. Promoted into the 74th Regiment, he served in the Fourth Anglo-Mysore War under General George Harris, and in the Second Anglo-Maratha War campaigns of 1803 and 1804. He was distinguished also in the battle of Assaye.

In 1805 he sold his commission, and, visiting an uncle, Samuel Tolfrey, in Ceylon, obtained a post in the public service there in 1806. In 1813 he was assistant commissioner of revenue and commerce, and shortly afterwards proficiency in Sinhalese obtained him the post of chief translator to the resident at Kandy. On the arrival of Sir Robert Brownrigg as governor in 1812, a Bible society was started, and Tolfrey undertook the revision of the old Sinhalese translation of the Bible made by the Dutch. Tolfrey died in Ceylon on 4 January 1817.

Works
An early English student of classical Pali, Tolfrey found the existing Sinhalese Bible translation too colloquial, and translated each verse into Pali as he worked. At the time of his death, he had nearly completed the translation of the New Testament into Pali, a work which was subsequently printed. Benjamin Clough used Tolfrey's materials for the compilation of his Pali grammar, produced in 1824.

References

Attribution

1778 births
1817 deaths
Translators of the Bible into Sinhalese
Christianity in Sri Lanka
British civil servants in Ceylon
British colonial governors and administrators in Asia
British military personnel of the Second Anglo-Maratha War
British military personnel of the Fourth Anglo-Mysore War
74th Highlanders officers
Sri Lankan people of English descent
People from Colombo
18th-century British translators